Arctic cisco (Coregonus autumnalis), also known as omul , is an anadromous species of freshwater whitefish that inhabits the Arctic parts of Siberia, Alaska and Canada. It has a close freshwater relative in several lakes of Ireland, known as the pollan, alternatively regarded as conspecific with it, or as a distinct species.

Taxonomy 
The freshwater omul of Lake Baikal, formerly considered a subspecies Coregonus autumnalis migratorius of the Arctic cisco, has no close genetic relationship to it and is now classified as a separate species, Coregonus migratorius.

Description 
The Arctic cisco have a relatively small head with a non-prominent snout. They have metallic silver body, a brown or dark green back, and nearly colorless fins. They have neither spots nor teeth on their jaws. They do have a patch of teeth on their tongue. They can reach 50 cm (20 in) in length and can weight up to 2 kg (4.4 lbs), but are usually less than 40 cm (16 in) in length and 1 kg (2.2 lbs) in weight.

Distribution and habitat 
Arctic cisco can be found in the Beaufort Sea, Colville River delta, and freshwater drainages east of the Sagavanirktok River. They can be found in several drainages in the Northwest Territories and Siberia, such as the Chaun River, and are not often found east of Point Barrow.

Food chain

Diet 
The Arctic cisco preys upon plankton, crustaceans, and small fishes.

Predators 
Predators of the Arctic cisco include marine mammals, seabirds, and large fishes such as the Dolly Varden trout and burbot.

Behaviors

Reproduction 
Arctic cisco are able to spawn at 8 or 9 years of age. Females may only be able to spawn two or three times in their life, and do not necessarily produce eggs every year.

The Arctic cisco reproduce in September. They do not reproduce in Alaskan waters, but do reproduce in Mackenzie River.

Females have up to 90,000 eggs.

Migration 
Young Arctic cisco migrate along the Beaufort Sea coast. They are then aided by winds to the Colville River delta, where they are over 160 km (100 mi) from where they spawned. They return to the Mackenzie River to spawn. They do not feed while migrating upward.

Life history 
Arctic cisco can live to be 13 years old or more.

Conservation 
Little is known of the abundance of the Arctic cisco in Alaska.

Threats 
The largest threats to the Arctic cisco appear to be climate change and oil and gas development.

References

Coregonus
Freshwater fish of the Arctic
Freshwater fish of Europe
Freshwater fish of the United States
Fish of Canada
Fish described in 1776